Cephalobaena is a genus of crustaceans in the subclass Pentastomida. It has only one species, Cephalobaena tetrapoda, and is the only genus in the monotypic order Cephalobaenida, and the family Cephalobaenidae .

References

Crustaceans
Monotypic crustacean genera